Nicolò Fagioli (born 12 February 2001) is an Italian footballer who plays as a midfielder for  club Juventus and the Italy national team.

Club career

Youth career 
In 2015, Fagioli moved to Juventus' youth setup, playing the 2015–16 season with the under-17s. Fagioli was early promoted to the Primavera (under-19s) side in the 2017–18 season, in which he scored 13 goals in 25 games. In 2018, Fagioli was included in The Guardian's best 60 world talents.

Juventus 
Fagioli made his Serie C debut for Juventus U23, the reserve team of Juventus, on 24 September 2018, in a 4–0 defeat against Carrarese, which was his only game of the 2018–19 season. On 27 January 2019, Fagioli was first called up to the first team for a Serie A match against Lazio. On 27 June 2020, Fagioli won the Coppa Italia Serie C after a 2–1 win against Ternana in the final. In 2019–20, Fagioli played five league games, helping Juventus U23 reach the promotion play-offs, where he played one game against Padova. 

On 1 November, Fagioli scored his first goal for Juventus U23 in a 1–1 home draw against Lecco. Fagioli ended the 2020–21 season with two goals scored in 20 appearances for Juventus U23. On 27 January 2021, Fagioli made his debut for Juventus, playing as a starter in a 4–0 Coppa Italia win over SPAL. His Serie A debut came on 22 February 2021, coming on as a substitute for Rodrigo Bentancur in the 69th minute in a 3–0 home win against Crotone.

On 31 August 2021, Fagioli was sent on a one-year loan to Serie B side Cremonese. On 12 September, Fagioli debuted for Cremonese in a 2–0 win against Cittadella. Seven days later, Fagioli scored his first goal for Cremonese in a 2–1 against Parma. Fagioli ended the season with a total of three goals in 33 appearances and helped Cremonese to be promoted in Serie A.

On 10 August 2022, Juventus announced that Fagioli had renewed his contract until 2026. On 14 September, he made his Champions League debut in a 2–1 defeat against Benfica. On 29 October, he scored his first Serie A goal in a 1–0 away win over Lecce, with a curling shot at the 70th minute.

International career
Fagioli was a starter in most games for Italy U17 at the 2018 UEFA European Under-17 Championship. In the final against the Netherlands, he came on as a substitute in the 55th minute and provided two assists in the next eight minutes to help his team come back from 0–1 deficit and take the 2–1 lead. Netherlands eventually equalized and beat Italy in the penalty shootout.

With Italy U19 Fagioli took part in the 2019 UEFA European Under-19 Championship.

On 3 September 2021, he made his debut with the Italy U21 squad, playing as a substitute in the qualifying match won 3–0 against Luxembourg.

On 16 November 2022, days after receiving his first senior call-up for the Italy national football team by head coach Roberto Mancini, Fagioli made his debut for the Azzurri during a friendly game against Albania.

Style of play 
Fagioli is a trequartista, mainly fielded as fantasista. Fagioli can also move down the pitch as a defensive midfielder or as a central midfielder. During his career, Fagioli has also played as a second striker, mezz'ala, playmaker. Fagioli has also often been compared to Andrea Pirlo.

Career statistics

Club

International

Honours
Juventus U23
 Coppa Italia Serie C: 2019–20

Juventus
 Serie A: 2018–19
 Coppa Italia: 2020–21
 Supercoppa Italiana: 2020

References

External links
Profile at the Juventus F.C. website
 

Living people
2001 births
Sportspeople from Piacenza
Footballers from Emilia-Romagna
Italian footballers
Italy youth international footballers
Italy international footballers
Association football midfielders
Piacenza Calcio 1919 players
U.S. Cremonese players
Juventus F.C. players
Juventus Next Gen players
Serie C players
Serie B players
Serie A players